"The Beat Goes On" is a song written and composed by Sonny Bono and recorded by Sonny & Cher. It was issued as a single and appeared on their 1967 album In Case You're in Love. It entered the Billboard Hot 100 chart on January 14, 1967, peaking at number six.

Song information
The backing music for the song was recorded using the renowned group of Los Angeles session musicians who, in time, came to be known collectively as "The Wrecking Crew." The arrangement is credited to Harold Battiste, but Wrecking Crew bassist Carol Kaye asserts that at the session she devised the distinctive syncopated bass line that is featured on the released recording, replacing the original walking bass line in the prepared arrangement:

Songfacts: "What's an example of one of the songs that you guys really added to and made it into a hit?"

Carol Kaye: "Well, "The Beat Goes On" is a biggie. I mean, it was a nothing song, and then the bass line kind of made that. But you'd have to say all of them. There's only a certain song, like "You've Lost That Lovin' Feelin'" that was guaranteed to be a hit because it was a great song. But about 95% of that stuff would not have been a hit without us, that's true."

The recording session for the song was held on December 13, 1966 at the Gold Star Studios in Hollywood, Los Angeles with a backing band of 19 musicians from The Wrecking Crew.  After a two and a half hour session to record the song, guitarist Barney Kessel is reported to have stood up and proclaimed, "Never have so many played so little for so much."

The song was sung at Sonny Bono's funeral, and the phrase "And the beat goes on" appears on his tombstone.

AllMusic highlighted this track in its review of the In Case You're in Love album.

The song's lyrics deal mainly with current events of the time, with the refrain "(And) the beat goes on, the beat goes on" following each verse.

Live performances
Sonny and Cher performed the song many times on their hit 1970s television variety shows, as well as in their live concerts. The song was included in the "Sonny and Cher" video montages during Cher's Do You Believe? Tour and The Farewell Tour. Cher performed the song live with Sonny's voice track on her successful Cher at the Colosseum show as well as her 2014 Dressed to Kill Tour and 2017-2020 Classic Cher shows. It's also performed during her Here We Go Again Tour (2018-2020). In 2019, Cher performed the song during the season finale of Dancing with the Stars

Personnel
According to the AFM contract sheet, the following musicians played on the track.

Harold Battiste
Gene Daniello
Dr. John
Michel Rubini
Frank Capp
Jim Gordon
Nick Pellico
Stanley Ross
Lyle Ritz
Bobby West
Keith Allison
David Cohen
Barney Kessel
Carol Kaye
Mike Post
Bill Green
Lou Blackburn
Frederick Hill
Melvin Moore

Charts

Weekly charts

Year-end charts

All Seeing I version

In 1997, British electronic music group All Seeing I released a version sampling the vocals from the Buddy Rich version. When re-released in 1998, it peaked at number 11 on the UK Singles Chart and No. 1 on the UK Dance Singles Chart. It also reached the top 40 in Scotland and New Zealand.

All Seeing I also produced a cover version of the song for Britney Spears in November 1998, as the last track on her debut album, ...Baby One More Time.

Other versions
 In 1967, the American jazz musician Buddy Rich performed a version on his Big Swing Face album, with his daughter Cathy on vocals, arranged by Shorty Rogers.
 The song was covered by Turkish band Silüetler and Gabor Szabo on his 1967 album The Sorcerer.
 In 1968, Vanilla Fudge included a version of it on their album The Beat Goes On, which they released that year.
 The R&B band Booker T. & the M.G.'s released a version on their Doin' Our Thing album in April 1968.

Other versions were recorded by jazz pianist/singer Patricia Barber, Italian singer Mina, and the French duo Casino Music.

 In 1982, an electro cover version was released by Orbit featuring Carol Hall with production by Don Was. It became a substantial dance club hit in January 1983.
 An Australian version, produced by former Skyhooks guitarist Red Symons, became a Top 30 hit in 1983; it was recorded by Melbourne cabaret duo the Globos, which featured singers Wendy De Waal and Mark Trevorrow, the latter of whom later gained renown for his comedic alter-ego Bob Downe.
 The British band Strange Cruise covered the song for their 1986 album Strange Cruise.
 The song was covered by Giant Sand on their 2002 album Cover Magazine.
 "The Beat Goes On" is the first track on Songs We Should Have Written (2004) by Firewater.
 The Pittsburgh, PA-based band The Spuds recorded a version for the 2007 tribute album BONOGRAPH: Sonny Gets His Share.
 In 2008, a version by the French acid jazz group Le Cercle was included on their album Magnetic.
 The Canadian jazz singer Emilie-Claire Barlow recorded the song for her album of the same title, which was nominated for "Vocal Jazz Album of the Year" at the Juno Awards of 2011.
2022 Beat Goes On (Rhythm to the Brain)

The song is sometimes incorrectly referred to as "And the Beat Goes On", as the closing lyric adds the word "and" to the song's title. R&B vocal group the Whispers, released an unrelated song titled "And the Beat Goes On" in 1980.

References

External links
 

1967 songs
1967 singles
1998 singles
Sonny & Cher songs
Atco Records singles
FFRR Records singles
Songs written by Sonny Bono